Gardab may refer to:
 Gardab 1
 Gardab 2

See also
 Gerdab (disambiguation)